Field archery was introduced as a World Games sport at the 1985 World Games in London. At the 2013 World Games in Cali the field compound even was replaced with an outdoor target event.

Field archery

Men

Recurve 
Until 1993 this event was called freestyle.

Compound

Barebow

Women

Recurve 
Until 1993 this event was called freestyle.

Compound

Barebow

Outdoor archery

Men

Compound

Women

Compound

Mixed

Compound Team

External links
World Archery - World Games Medallists

 
Sports at the World Games
World Games